Jorge Luís da Silva, known as Luiz Fumanchu (born 14 November 1952) is a Brazilian former professional footballer who played as a forward.

Career
Born in Castelo, Espírito Santo, Fumanchu began playing football with local side Castelo Futebol Clube from age 14. However, his older brother, Sérgio Roberto, encouraged him to join him at Fluminense Football Club in Rio de Janeiro. He played for CR Vasco da Gama and Santa Cruz Futebol Clube during 1974 through 1977.

Fumanchu moved to Mexico in 1979, joining Club América for one season. He returned to Brazil where he played for Londrina Esporte Clube.

After he retired, Fumanchu became a sports radio commentator based in Castelo.

References

External links

1952 births
Living people
People from Castelo, Espírito Santo
Sportspeople from Espírito Santo
Brazilian footballers
Association football forwards
Fluminense FC players
CR Vasco da Gama players
Santa Cruz Futebol Clube players
CR Flamengo footballers
Club América footballers
Londrina Esporte Clube players
Esporte Clube Vitória players
Liga MX players
Brazilian expatriate footballers
Brazilian expatriate sportspeople in Mexico
Expatriate footballers in Mexico